Branch Line Press is an American book publishing company founded in 1986 in Pepperell, Massachusetts. The company specializes in reference books on the culture and history of the New England area. Special emphasis is given to New England transportation guides.

References
Branch Line Press, Publishers' Catalogue, retrieved 2 August 2009

Book publishing companies based in Massachusetts
Publishing companies established in 1986
1986 establishments in Massachusetts